Darwin College is a constituent college of the University of Cambridge. Founded on 28 July 1964, Darwin was Cambridge University's first graduate-only college, and also the first to admit both men and women. The college is named after one of the university's most famous families and alumni, that of Charles Darwin. The Darwin family previously owned some of the land, Newnham Grange, on which the college now stands.

The college has between 600 and 700 students, mostly studying for PhD or MPhil degrees with strengths in the sciences, humanities, and law. About half the students come from outside the United Kingdom, representing 80 nationalities as of 2016. Darwin is the largest graduate college of Cambridge. Darwin's sister college at Oxford University is Wolfson College. 

Members of Darwin College are termed Darwinians. The college has several distinguished alumni including prominent heads of government and state, politicians, diplomats, and scientists from various countries such as British primatologist and anthropologist Jane Goodall,  American conservationist Dian Fossey, Barbadian Governor-General Elliott Belgrave, Nobel Prize winner Elizabeth Blackburn, Nobel Prize winner Eric Maskin, Solicitor-General of the United States Paul Clement, Global Energy Prize winning scientist Thorsteinn I. Sigfusson, and Pulitzer Prize nominated neurosurgeon Paul Kalanithi. 

Sir Ian Wilmut, the leader of the research group that in 1996 first cloned a mammal from an adult somatic cell (a Finnish Dorset lamb named Dolly), is also an alumnus of the college. Honorary fellows include Nobel laureate Amartya Sen, and the scientist Martin Rees. Notable students and fellows of Darwin College include British politician Oliver Letwin, Nobel Prize winner Richard Henderson and four Nobel Laureates. The college has 23 Fellows of the Royal Society among its current, emeritus, and honorary fellows including Dame Jane Francis.

History 

A significant increase in the number of postgraduate students at Cambridge University in the post-war period led to a growing realisation that a graduate college was becoming a necessity. In 1963, three of the university's older colleges – Trinity College, St John's College, and Gonville and Caius College – announced their intention to jointly form a new, wholly graduate college. The college was established in 1964, located on the bank of the River Cam, opposite Queens' College. On 29 January 1965, the Privy Council gave formal approval to the college as an Approved Foundation. It received its Royal Charter as an independent college within the university in 1976.

The college is named after the Darwin family, Charles Darwin's second son, George Darwin, having owned some of the property which the college now occupies. He bought Newnham Grange, the oldest part of the college, in 1885, together with the adjacent building known as The Old Granary, and Small Island. (Newnham Grange was originally built in 1793 for the family of Patrick Beales, a local corn and coal merchant. It was extensively remodelled by George Darwin.) 

Following the death of George's son, Sir Charles Galton Darwin, in 1962, those concerned with the foundation of the new college learned that the property was to become available. Katherine, Lady Darwin, and her family were very receptive to the idea of their home becoming the nucleus of a new college, and to the suggestion that it should bear the family's name. Family portraits of the Darwin family are on loan to the college from the Darwin Heirloom Trust and can be found on the walls of several of the college's main rooms. In the book Period Piece: A Cambridge Childhood, the granddaughter of Charles Darwin, Gwen Raverat describes how she grew up at Newnham Grange.

A commemorative book entitled Darwin College: A 50th Anniversary Portrait was commissioned and published by the college in 2014 to commemorate the 50th anniversary of the founding of the college in 1964.

Buildings
Darwin College is known for its distinctive Georgian and Victorian architecture, gardens, and college site which is integrated into the nearby River Cam. 

Located on Silver Street and Newnham Road, the college is also known for the Darwin College Bridges which connect the college grounds with the two islands of the college.

In 1966 the college acquired the Hermitage (a house built in the nineteenth century on the west side of Newnham Grange) from St John's College. Work to convert and extend the college's buildings was funded by the founding colleges and through substantial donations from the Rayne Foundation established by Sir Max Rayne, a Jewish businessman and philanthropist.

In 1994 Darwin College completed construction of a new library and study centre along the side of The Old Granary. The centre is built on a narrow strip of land alongside the millpond in Cambridge, and uses a structure of green oak and lime mortar brickwork. The building uses high-level automatically opening windows and a chimney to control natural ventilation.

In 2004, the college acquired the Malting House to accommodate 12 students. The Malting House is Grade II listed and its name reflects the original purpose of the building. The building was the home of the Malting House School, which experimented with radical ideas in education in the 1920s.

In 2010 the college acquired No 4 Newnham Terrace, the former Rectory for the Church of St Mary the Less, Cambridge (Little St Mary's) thereby finally establishing an entire boundary for the college from Queen's Bridge to Newnham Road and to the River Granta.  The long boundary returns to Queen's Bridge and is formed by the two islands in the middle of the river.

Academic profile 
Darwin College has particular strengths across a range of subjects and is particularly strong in the sciences, law, and humanities with the majority of the postgraduate students graduating with PhDs and MPhils in these academic subjects. 

As a postgraduate college, Darwin College is not ranked in the Tompkins Table ranking of Cambridge colleges that provide undergraduate studies.

Student life 

The college organises the annual prestigious Darwin Lecture Series, eight talks over eight weeks structured around a single theme (such as 'Power') examined from very different perspectives (scientific, humanities, arts), given by eminent speakers who are leading international authorities in their fields. The lectures have been hosted for over twenty-five years and form one of the key events in the Cambridge calendar. Most of the series of lectures have been published as books and the more recent series are also available as videos for free live-streaming and download. Past speakers at the Darwin Lecture Series have included Sir Walter Bodmer, Rose George, Andrew Fabian, and historian David Olusoga. The inaugural lecture was given by Karl Popper.

The college has a 24 hour library and study centre overlooking the River Cam and provides extensive punting for its students. 

In sports, Darwin College Boat Club is a popular student society at Darwin College, as well as Darwin College Football Club who play in the long established Cambridge University Association Football League (CUAFL), representing the only graduate college within CUAFL. The club plays throughout the year in and out of term. 

The college has regular formal dinners with students and fellows and also holds annual May Balls during Cambridge's May Week. 

Every Darwinian is automatically a member of the Darwin College Student Association (DCSA). The DCSA committee comprises 20 students, organising events and parties, supporting societies, and helping students make the most of their time in Cambridge.

The Darwin College University Challenge team achieved some success on University Challenge in the 2018-2019 season reaching the semi-finals of the competition led by captain Jason Golfinos. The College team reached the first-round of the 2020-21 season of University Challenge.

Notable alumni

Darwin College is associated with a number of distinguished alumni including former students, fellows of the college and past masters. Darwinians have achieved great success in a wide variety of careers including as scientists, lawyers, politicians, academics, civil servants, diplomats, and representatives of international organisations.

Elizabeth Blackburn, the 2009 Nobel laureate in medicine, studied for her PhD at Darwin. Eric Maskin, the 2007 Nobel laureate in economics, was a visiting student in 1975–76. 

Conservationists Jane Goodall and Dian Fossey, Brian Gibson, Seamus O'Regan and Sir Ian Wilmut, the leader of the research group that first cloned the sheep Dolly, a mammal from an adult somatic cell, are alumni/ae. 

Paul Clement, the former United States Solicitor General, read for an MPhil in Politics and Economics at Darwin in 1988–89. Elliott Belgrave, the Governor-General and High Court Judge of Barbados was an alumnus of the College. 

Paul Kalanithi, the Pulitzer Prize nominated Stanford neurosurgeon and author of the New York Times Best Seller 'When Breath Becomes Air', was an MPhil student at Darwin.

The philosopher Huw Price, current Bertrand Russell Professor of Philosophy at Cambridge, studied for his PhD in philosophy at Darwin under the philosopher Hugh Mellor, an erstwhile fellow of the college. The philosopher Nigel Warburton also studied for his PhD at Darwin. British nutritionist Professor Ann Prentice is also an alumnus of the university. 

British architect and founder of van Heyningen and Haward Architects Joanna Van Heyningen is an alumnus of the college. 

Alumni who became notable in sport include Helen McFie, a Scottish rower who as a member of the Cambridge University Boat Club won the 1971 and 1972 Boat Races and who competed for Great Britain at the 1975 World Rowing Championships. The Sri Lankan first-class cricketer Gajan Pathmanathan studied at Darwin College in 1982 and played first-class cricket at Cambridge.

Three current or former masters of Cambridge colleges are Darwin alumnae: Professor Mary Fowler (Darwin), Nicola Padfield (Fitzwilliam), and Professor Dame Jean Thomas (St. Catharine's).

Fellows 

César Milstein, who received the 1984 Nobel Prize in Physiology or Medicine, was a Fellow of Darwin College from 1980 to 2002. Richard Henderson, winner of the 2017 Nobel Prize in Chemistry, has been a Fellow since 1981. 

Sir Karl Popper and the Nobel Prize winner Max Perutz were Honorary Fellows, as are Amartya Sen and Martin Rees. Oliver Letwin was a research Fellow from 1981 to 1982. 

Nick Phillips, Baron Phillips of Worth Matravers, the inaugural president of the Supreme Court of the United Kingdom and Tom Bingham, Baron Bingham of Cornhill, a Lords of Appeal in Ordinary were visiting professors at Darwin College in 1996 and between 2005 and 2008

See also 
 Malting House School
 Masters of Darwin College, Cambridge
 Colleges of the University of Cambridge
List of Honorary Fellows of Darwin College, Cambridge

References

External links 

 
 Darwin lectures
 Darwin College Boat Club
 Darwin College Football Club

 
Colleges of the University of Cambridge
Postgraduate schools in the United Kingdom
Educational institutions established in 1964
1964 establishments in England